Cladosporium elegans is a species of fungi in the genus Cladosporium (Anamorphic Davidiella). It forms arid brown spots on living leaves of oranges in Italy.

References

External links 

 Cladosporium elegans at indexfungorum.org
 Cladosporium elegans at mycobank.org
 

elegans
Fungal citrus diseases
Fungi described in 1882